Sushma Rana is an Indian shooter who won a gold medal at the 2006 Commonwealth Games, earning 1140 points, with her partner Saroja Kumari Jhuthu. She competes in the 25-meter shooting events and has held the national record for 25-metre shooting event from 2002 to 2003. She was inspired by Jaspal Rana, her older brother and a shooting champion himself, to take up the sport.

She is the daughter-in-law of the Union Defence Minister Rajnath Singh.

Biography

Sushma was born the daughter of Narayan Singh Rana, an old-time BJP member. She has two brothers, including the shooting champion, Jaspal Rana , who has been honoured with the Arjuna Award and the Padma Shri.

References
 "Sushma Rana rewrites National mark" - rediff.com article dated 16 December 2003
 "Sushma Rana wins gold" - rediff.com article dated 3 December 2005

Notes 

Indian female sport shooters
ISSF pistol shooters
Living people
Shooters at the 2006 Commonwealth Games
Commonwealth Games gold medallists for India
Commonwealth Games medallists in shooting
21st-century Indian women
21st-century Indian people
Year of birth missing (living people)
Medallists at the 2006 Commonwealth Games